This is a list of singers, bands, composers, conductors, and other musicians originating from or based in Nova Scotia.

A
 Robert Aitken
 Alert the Medic
 April Wine
 Rich Aucoin

B

 Carroll Baker
 Adam Baldwin
 Jill Barber
 The Barra MacNeils
 Black Moor
 Blou
 Brian Borcherdt
 Buck 65

C

 John Allan Cameron
 George Canyon
 Ben Caplan
 Wilf Carter
 Classified
 Contrived
 J. P. Cormier
 The Cottars
 Rose Cousins
 Brendan Croskerry
 Susan Crowe
 Crush
 Amelia Curran

D
 Jesse Dangerously
 Tanya Davis
 Denise Djokic
 Melanie Doane
 Dog Day
 Denny Doherty
 Luke Doucet

G

 Gloryhound
 Grand Dérangement
 Jenn Grant
 Dave Gunning
 The Guthries
 Gypsophilia

H
 The Halifax III
 The Hardship Post
 Heavy Blinkers
 Ryan Hemsworth
 Rebekah Higgs
 Hip Club Groove
 Holy Fuck
 The Hylozoists
 Hank Snow

I
 In-Flight Safety
 The Inbreds

J
 Jale
 Jah’Mila
 Jellyfishbabies
 Jimmy Swift Band
 JRDN

K
 Mo Kenney

L
 Mary Jane Lamond
 Daniel Ledwell

M

 Martin MacDonald
 Ryan MacGrath
 Ashley MacIsaac
 Buddy MacMaster
 Natalie MacMaster
 Rita MacNeil
 Dutch Mason
 Matt Mays and El Torpedo
 MCJ and Cool G
 Sarah McLachlan
 The Memories Attack
 The Men of the Deeps
 Ruth Minnikin
 Mir
 The Motes
 Chris Murphy
 Anne Murray
 Dale Murray
 David Myles
 Matt Minglewood

N
 North of America

O
 Old Man Luedecke

P

 Patrick Pentland
 Bill Plaskett
 Joel Plaskett and his band The Emergency
 Plumtree

R
 Radio Radio
 The Rankin Family
 Stan Rogers
 Ruby Jean and the Thoughtful Bees

S

 Gordie Sampson
 Sandbox
 Shyne Factory
 Sixtoo
 Skratch Bastid
 Sloan
 Slowcoaster
 Snow
 Mike Smith of Sandbox
 Sons of Maxwell
 The Stanfields
 The Stolen Minks
 The Super Friendz
 Symphony Nova Scotia

T

 Tasseomancy 
 Thrush Hermit
 Georg Tintner
 Tom Fun Orchestra
 The Trews
 Al Tuck
 TWRP (formerly Tupper Ware Remix Party)

U
 Jody Upshaw

W

 Dinuk Wijeratne
 Wintersleep
 Portia White
 Wordburglar

See also
 Halifax Pop Explosion
 List of musical groups from Halifax, Nova Scotia
 Music of Nova Scotia
 Music of the Maritimes

Nova Scotia
Musicians